Bradyrhizobium jicamae is a Gram-negative, strictly aerobic bacteria from the genus Bradyrhizobium.

References

External links
Type strain of Bradyrhizobium jicamae at BacDive -  the Bacterial Diversity Metadatabase

Nitrobacteraceae
Bacteria described in 2009